The Doab famine of 1860–1861 was a famine in India that affected the Ganga-Yamuna Doab in the North-Western Provinces, large parts of Rohilkhand and Awadh, the Delhi and Hissar divisions of the Punjab, all in British India, then under Crown rule, and the eastern regions of the princely states of Rajputana.  Up to 2 million people are thought to have perished in the famine.

See also
Timeline of major famines in India during British rule

References

 

Famines in British India
1860 in India
1861 in India
British administration in Uttar Pradesh
19th-century famines
1860 disasters in India
1861 disasters in India
1860 disasters in Asia
1861 disasters in Asia